Harry Chandlee (1882–1956) was an American screenwriter and film editor and occasional producer. He co-wrote the screenplay for Sergeant York, which was nominated for the Academy Award for Best Original Screenplay at the 1941 Oscars.

During the late 1920s he briefly worked in Britain, editing Moulin Rouge for British International Pictures and The Woman in White for Herbert Wilcox.

Selected filmography

Writer
 A Magdalene of the Hills (1917)
 Bolshevism on Trial (1919)
 The Law of the Yukon (1920)
 Out of the Chorus (1921)
 Suspicious Wives (1921)
 One Law for the Woman (1924)
 The Man Without a Heart (1924)
 Those Who Judge (1924)
 Back to Life (1925)
 Lilies of the Streets (1925)
 Anything Once (1925)
 No Babies Wanted (1926)
 Broadway Madness (1927)
 A Bowery Cinderella (1927)
 Back to Liberty (1927)
Women Who Dare (1928)
 Satan and the Woman (1928)
 The Stronger Will (1928)
 Inspiration (1928)
 A Bit of Heaven (1928)
 Reno (1930)
 Platinum Blonde (1931)
 The Dude Ranger (1934)
 Rainbow on the River (1936)
 Our Town (1940)
 Sergeant York (1941)
 Three Is a Family (1944)
 Rhapsody in Blue (1945)
 The Jolson Story (1946)
 Tarzan's Magic Fountain (1949)

Editor
 Moulin Rouge (1928)
 The Woman in White (1929)
 What a Man (1930)

References

Bibliography
 Munden, Kenneth White. The American Film Institute Catalog of Motion Pictures Produced in the United States, Part 1. University of California Press, 1997.

External links

1882 births
1956 deaths
American film editors
American film producers
Screenwriters from Washington, D.C.
20th-century American screenwriters